ADBI may refer to:
 Asian Development Bank Institute
 A synthetic musk